According to the Church of Scientology, ethics may be defined as the actions an individual takes on himself to ensure his continued survival across the dynamics. It is a personal thing. When one is ethical, it is something he does himself by his own choice.

According to founder L. Ron Hubbard's teachings, Scientology ethics is predicated on the idea that there are degrees of ethical conduct.

Good and evil
The Church's official position declares that "the logic of Scientology ethics is inarguable and based upon two key concepts: good and evil", and goes on to state that "nothing is completely good, and to build anew often requires a degree of destruction" and "to appreciate what Scientology ethics is all about, it must be understood that good can be considered to be a constructive survival action".

Statistics
In order to make ethical decisions that affect others around them, Scientologists are expected to use statistical measurement to assess the "measurement of survival potential". The Church's official website on ethics explains that "with an understanding of how to compile, graph and compare statistics, the Scientologist is amply equipped to determine exactly what condition an activity is in, and thus exactly what steps he must take in order to better that condition."

Hubbard stated that all Scientology organizations need to keep their statistics of production up, and that Ethics action must be brought against the staff member responsible for the particular statistic should it be continually down.
"Example: a typist gets out 500 letters in one week. That's a statistic. If the next week the typist gets out 600 letters that's an UP statistic. If the typist gets out 300 letters that's a DOWN statistic.... the purpose is to keep production (statistics) up." 

— L. Ron Hubbard, HCOPL 1 Sep 1965

According to The Scientology Handbook, the Scientology method of statistics can, and should, be applied to individuals, groups, organizations, and any production activities inside and outside Scientology. Hubbard prescribes a very specific method of plotting statistics on graphs, and then for analysis of these graphs in terms of five levels of "Ethics Conditions". The main categories for these conditions are:

 Non-existence condition: line on graph steeply or vertically down.
 Danger condition: line on graph diagonally down.
 Emergency condition: line on graph remains level, or slightly down.
 Normal condition: line on graph slightly up.
 Affluence condition: line on graph steeply up.

The Scientology Handbook also says, however, that the complete set of conditions is as follows (ranked from highest to lowest):
Power
Power Change
Affluence
Normal Operation
Emergency
Danger
Non-Existence
Liability
Doubt
Enemy
Treason
Confusion

Ethics protection
In 1965, Hubbard issued the policy letter HCOPL 1 Sep 1965 (reissued 5 Oct 1985) entitled "Ethics Protection". In it, he states that "Ethics actions are often used to handle down individual statistics. A person who is not doing his job becomes an Ethics target" and goes on to detail how a Scientologist can protect himself from Ethics punishment by being more productive and keeping statistics up: "In short, a staff member can get away with murder so long as his statistic is up and can't sneeze without a chop if it's down."

If the staff member's production is sufficiently high (as evidenced by an up statistic), the Scientologist gains an immunity to the Ethics process, even if they have openly committed violations:
When people do start reporting a staff member with a high statistic, what you investigate is the person who turned in the report. In an ancient army a particularly brave deed was recognized by an award of the title of Kha-Khan. It was not a rank. The person remained what he was, BUT he was entitled to be forgiven the death penalty ten times in case in the future he did anything wrong. That was a Kha-Khan. That's what producing, high-statistic staff members are – Kha-Khans. They can get away with murder without a blink from Ethics.... And Ethics must recognize a Kha-Khan when it sees one – and tear up the bad report chits on the person with a yawn.

Punishment

Researcher Jon Atack has expressed concern that, in the wrong hands, Scientology ethics can be wielded arbitrarily and absurdly, such as in the 1960s when British Saint Hill Scientologists declared a local pie shop "Suppressive" for not carrying apple pie in sufficient quantities to their liking.

Critical analysis
Professor Stephen A. Kent quotes Hubbard as pronouncing that "the purpose of ethics is to remove counter intentions from the environment. And having accomplished that the purpose becomes to remove other intentionedness from the environment" and "(a)ll ethics is for in actual fact is simply that additional tool necessary to make it possible to get [Scientology] technology in. That's the whole purpose of ethics; to get technology in".

What this translates to, says Kent, is "a peculiar brand of morality that uniquely benefitted (the Church of Scientology) ... In plain English, the purpose of Scientology ethics is to eliminate opponents, then eliminate people's interests in things other than Scientology. In this 'ethical' environment, Scientology would be able to impose its courses, philosophy, and 'justice system' – its so-called technology – onto society."

References

External links
System of Ethics on Scientology.org

Scientology beliefs and practices